Anatoma africana is a species of minute sea snail, a marine gastropod mollusk or micromollusk in the family Anatomidae.

Distribution
This species occurs in the Indian Ocean off Madagascar.

References

External links
 To Encyclopedia of Life
 To World Register of Marine Species

Anatomidae
Gastropods described in 1963